Thornliebank railway station is a railway station in the village of Thornliebank, East Renfrewshire, Greater Glasgow, Scotland. The station is managed by ScotRail and is on the Glasgow South Western Line (East Kilbride branch).

History 

The station was opened by the Busby Railway on 1 October 1881.

There was a ticket office located on the down (Glasgow bound) platform, but was destroyed by vandals in 1983.

Services 

References

Notes

Sources 
 
 
 
 RAILSCOT on Busby Railway

Railway stations in East Renfrewshire
SPT railway stations
Railway stations served by ScotRail
Railway stations in Great Britain opened in 1881
Former Caledonian Railway stations
1881 establishments in Scotland